Spodnje Danje (in older sources also Spodnje Dajne) is a village in the Municipality of Železniki in the Upper Carniola region of Slovenia.

Church

The church in the village is dedicated to Saint Mark. It is originally a late Gothic structure from the 16th century that was reworked in the Baroque style in the 18th century, and the nave was vaulted in 1863. The main altar in the church dates from 1739 (with older statuary), and the side altars date from the end of the 18th century. The chancel contains frescoes painted by Simon Ogrin in 1910.

References

External links
Spodnje Danje at Geopedia

Populated places in the Municipality of Železniki